The Democratic Party of Republika Srpska (Demokratska Stranka Republike Srpske) was a Serbian political party in Bosnia and Herzegovina.

History
The party was established in 2009 by Dragan Čavić, who left the Serbian Democratic Party. In 2013 it merged with the National Democratic Party to form the National Democratic Movement.

External links
Official website

Political parties in Republika Srpska
Defunct political parties in Bosnia and Herzegovina
Serb political parties in Bosnia and Herzegovina
Political parties established in 2009
Political parties disestablished in 2013
2009 establishments in Bosnia and Herzegovina
2013 disestablishments in Bosnia and Herzegovina